Bharat Sundar (born 30 August 1988 in Chennai) is a Carnatic music singer from India. He is a regular performer in the Madras Margazhi Music Season and has extensively performed in international music festivals in USA, Australia, UK, Dubai, Singapore, and Kuwait. He is also a graded artiste (A Grade) of All India Radio.

Education 
Sundar started learning Carnatic Music at the age of 6 from Smt. Gayathri Mahesh. Later, he came under the tutelage of Vidushi Mrs. Leelavathi Gopalakrishnan and her son Sri. G Srikanth for over 10 years. He took special training in Pallavi singing from Sri. J Venkatraman and Sri. Srimushnam V. Raja Rao.

After receiving a B. Com and CA Intermediate Course, he studied for a M. Music (Master in Indian Classical Music) and was a Gold Medalist from the University of Madras.

Currently, he continues to learn from his gurus Vidwan Sri. P S Narayanaswamy and from Sangita Kalanidhi Dr. S Sowmya.

Awards and recognition 
 Kalki Krishnamurthy Memorial Award from Kalki Krishnamurthy Trust (2019)
 Best Concert Award in Senior Category from Music Academy (2018)
 Best Vocalist in Sub Senior Category from Music Academy (2016)
 Maharajapuram Viswanatha Iyer Youth Excellence Award from Maharajapuram Santhanam Trust (2016)
 M S Subbalakshmi Birth Centenary Scholarship from Sri Shanmukhananda Fine Arts & Sangeetha Sabha, Mumbai (2015)
 Outstanding vocalist Award in Sub Senior category from Music Academy (2015)
 Dr. M.L.V. Award Instituted by Smt. Sudha Raghunathan from Sri Parthasarathi Swamy Sabha (2015)
 Bru Canatic Music Idol 2010 by Jaya TV (2010) 
 Isai Chudar from Karthik Fine Arts (2010)
 Yuvakala Barathi from Bharat Kalachar (2009) 
 Balakalaratna from Balakalasagaram Trust (2008)
 Yuva Kala Vipanchee from Vipanchi Institution (2007)
 Best performer in Junior Category from Indian Fine Arts (2006)
 Best performer in Junior Category from Thyagabrama Gana Sabha (2006)
 Bala Bhaskara from VDS Arts Academy (2005)
 First Prize in the All India Radio Music Competition (2005)
 The Centre for Cultural Resources and Training (CCRT) Scholarship from Ministry of Culture (2005)

References

External links 
 Bharat Sundar's Music Blog
 Bharat Sundar scored with voice and range
 Bharat Sundar: Display of virtuosity
 Youth ruled at Bharat Sundar’s recital
 ‘Balance’ was the watchword at Bharat Sundar’s concert
 Bharat Sundar | Carnatic Vocal | Darbar Artists | Music of India
 Madrasana Carnatic Festival 2018 (Live)
 Bharat Sundar's Youtube Channel

 Bharat Sundar's Website

Male Carnatic singers
Carnatic singers
Living people
1988 births